Carla Mancini (born 21 April 1950) is an Italian film and television actress. A graduate of the Centro Sperimentale di Cinematografia she made numerous appearances in films of the early 1970s.

Selected filmography
 Rough Justice (1970)
 The President of Borgorosso Football Club (1970)
 The Bird with the Crystal Plumage (1970)
 Desert of Fire (1971)
 Erika (1971)
 The Red Queen Kills Seven Times (1972)
 Who Killed the Prosecutor and Why? (1972)
 La prima notte di quiete (1972)
 100 Fäuste und ein Vaterunser (1972)
 Seven Blood-Stained Orchids (1972)
 Go Away! Trinity Has Arrived in Eldorado (1972)
 How Funny Can Sex Be? (1973)
 The Fighting Fist of Shanghai Joe (1973)
 My Name Is Nobody (1973)
 Cry of a Prostitute (1974)
 L'arbitro (1974)
 Pasqualino Cammarata, Frigate Captain (1974)
 The Visitor (1974)
 The Perfume of the Lady in Black (1974)
 Somewhere Beyond Love (1974)
 Appassionata (1974)
 Beyond the Door (1974)
 Il... Belpaese (1977)

References

Bibliography 
 Alex Cox. 10,000 Ways to Die: A Director's Take on the Spaghetti Western. Oldcastle Books, 2009.
 Thomas Weisser. Spaghetti Westerns--the Good, the Bad and the Violent: A Comprehensive, Illustrated Filmography of 558 Eurowesterns and Their Personnel, 1961–1977. McFarland, 2005.

External links 
 

1950 births
Living people
Italian film actresses
Italian television actresses
Actresses from Rome
Centro Sperimentale di Cinematografia alumni